1916 is the ninth studio album by British rock band Motörhead, released in January 1991. It was their first on WTG Records. The single "The One to Sing the Blues" peaked at number 45. The album was the final Motörhead album to feature Phil "Philthy Animal" Taylor on drums in its entirety.

Background
In 1990, Motörhead frontman Lemmy moved from England to the U.S., settling in West Hollywood within walking distance of the Rainbow Bar and Grill. With Phil Carson managing the band, the sessions for what would become the album 1916 began with Ed Stasium, best known for producing the Ramones, Talking Heads, and Living Colour. The band recorded four songs with the producer before deciding he had to go. When Lemmy listened to a mix of Going to Brazil, he asked him to turn up four tracks, and on doing so heard claves and tambourines Stasium had added without the band's knowledge. Stasium was fired and Pete Solley hired as producer.

Recording
1916 was Motörhead's first studio album in nearly four years, and their first release on WTG after a legal battle with GWR Records was resolved. Some of its songs – including "The One to Sing the Blues", "I'm So Bad (Baby I Don't Care)", "No Voices in the Sky", "Going to Brazil" and "Shut You Down" – were originally performed on Motörhead's 1989 and 1990 tours. The title track – an uncharacteristically slow ballad in which Lemmy's singing is only lightly accompanied – is a tribute to, and reflection on, young soldiers who fell in battle during World War I. In his 2002 memoir, Lemmy reveals that the song was inspired by the Battle of the Somme:

Although songs like the ballad "Love Me Forever" and "Angel City" (which includes a saxophone) were stylistic departures for the band, the album still contained Motörhead's ear-splitting brand of rock 'n' roll, including "I'm So Bad (Baby I Don't Care)" and "R.A.M.O.N.E.S", a tribute to punk band the Ramones, by whom it was covered. In the 2002 book Hey Ho Let's Go: The Story of the Ramones, Everett True quotes singer Joey Ramone as saying: "It was the ultimate honour – like John Lennon wrote a song for you."

In the album's liner notes, the band says:

The absence of French, Bulgarian, Russian, Serbian and Portuguese flags from the album artwork was explained as an unintentional oversight. "Love Me Forever" was later covered by Doro Pesch, and Beyond the Black.

The Yugoslavian release of the album on ZKP-RTVL was the final record to be released in Slovenia prior to its independence and the renaming of the label to ZKP-RTVS.

Critical reception

The LP received mostly positive reviews from contemporary critics. Robert Christgau rated it an A−, calling it "sonically retrograde and philosophically advanced." Rolling Stone remarked how the album "..manages to mingle ruthlessness and listenability like never before... creating a new threshold of sharpness for the genre. Fortunately, the crisper approach only makes the cruelty of the group's playing more pronounced." Q also praised the album and wrote that "at 45 the godfather of thrash metal still won't give the old folks a break...Motorhead's ninth studio album is a mad morass of noise, the turbocharged twin guitars of Wurzel and Campbell adding a modern machine sheen to the more primeval approach of Lemmy's shot-blasted vocals." Select reviewer called 1916 "the most cohesive and downright ferocious record to appear under the Motorhead banner since the timeless blast of 'Ace of Spades' in 1980... Motorhead badly needed an album like this, but no one could have guessed they'd do it so convincingly."

In a retrospective review, AllMusic's Alex Henderson wrote that "the band's sound hadn't changed much, and time hadn't made its sledgehammer approach any less appealing... whether the subject matter is humorously fun or more serious, Motörhead is as inspired as ever on 1916." Reviewing a reissue on the Hear No Evil label, Kris Needs wrote in Classic Rock: "One of their most well-rounded sets, this memorabilia-stacked reissue comes with two non-album belters, 'Eagle Rock' and runaway hell train 'Dead Man's Hand'."

In the Motörhead documentary The Guts and the Glory, Lemmy stated: 

The album was nominated for Best Metal Performance at the 1992 Grammys, but lost to Metallica's Metallica (The Black Album), released approximately six months after 1916.

Track listing

Personnel
Per the album's liner notes.
 Lemmy – lead vocals, bass
 Phil "Wizzö" Campbell – guitar
 Michael "Würzel" Burston – guitar
 Phil "Philthy Animal" Taylor – drums
 James Hoskins – cello on "1916"

Production
Peter Solley – producer, mixing
Ed Stasium – producer ("No Voices in the Sky", "Going To Brazil" and "Love Me Forever")
Casey McMackin – engineer
 Paul Hemingson – engineer ("No Voices in the Sky", "Going To Brazil" and "Love Me Forever")
Steve Hall – mastering
Graig Nelson – album cover
Toni Hanzon – album cover
Joe Petagno – Snaggletooth

Charts

References

External links
  Motörhead official website

1991 albums
Motörhead albums
Albums produced by Ed Stasium
Epic Records albums